The Grand Prix is an award, born in 1985, of the Annecy Italian Film Festival bestowed by the jury of the festival on one of the competing feature films.

Grand Prix

External links
 Annecy Italian Film Festival official website
 Annecy Italian Film Festival at IMDb.

French film awards